PortNews is an information-and-analytical agency PortNews IAA provides detailed on-line news and analytical materials related to Russian market of port services, sea and river transportation, shipbuilding. Special attention is paid to oil and fuel markets. Informational resource comprises exclusive branch news lines: Bunkering, Logistics, Stevedoring, Shipbuilding, and Surveyor services. All news placed at the agency's portal are available on open access. Every day the agency's information portal is visited by about 4,000
specialists including personnel of the Ministry of Transport, representatives of port administrations, regional authorities and
regulatory agencies. Besides, PortNews IAA provides consulting, marketing, advertising and PR services.

Since 2008 IAA PortNews has been being a member of the Association of Sea Commercial Ports (ASOP).

Projects Agency
Information portal (www.en.portnews.ru) was established in 2004. The portal is the mass media.

Information portal "Rus-shipping». was established in 2011 as a joint project of the Association of Shipping industry association of companies and PortNews.

Edition of "Port Service. Bunker market - is an analytical report. It's issued by PortNews twice a year on the basis of the industry since 2005. The publication is intended as information and analysis, contains reviews and analytical articles, own statistics agency.

References

External links
Mintrans.ru
IAA En.portnews.ru
Rus-shipping.ru

News agencies based in Russia
Mass media in Saint Petersburg